The electoral history of Jerry Brown, California Governor (1975–1983, 2011–2019), Secretary of State (1971–1975), Attorney General (2007–2011); and Mayor of Oakland (1999–2007).

Secretary of State

Governor

1974

1978

2010

2014

Democratic Presidential Nominee

1976

1980

1992

Democratic Vice Presidential Nominee

US Senate

Mayor

1998

2002

Attorney General

References

External links
Profile at OurCampaigns.com

Jerry Brown
Brown, Jerry